Bumpy may refer to:

 Bumpy Johnson (1905–1968), African-American mobster
 Bumpy Jones (1933–2021), American competition swimmer
 Bumpy Kanahele, Hawaiian nationalist leader
 Mr. Bumpy, a character in the television series Bump in the Night
 Bumpy (video game), a 1989 platform game

See also
 Bump (disambiguation)
 

Lists of people by nickname